Strange Fantasy is a 36-page, 10 cent, bi-monthly, anthology horror comics title published by Ajax-Farrell in the early 1950s.  Its initial issue cover dates October 1952 and its last issue October/November 1954, for a total of 13 issues.

References

Overstreet, Robert M.. Official Overstreet Comic Book Price Guide. House of Collectibles, 2004.

External links
The Comic Book Database Strange Fantasy gallery of all 13 comic book covers

Horror comics
American comics titles